The Americas Zone was one of three zones of regional competition in the 2010 Fed Cup.

Group I
Venue: Yacht y Golf Club Paraguayo, Lambaré, Paraguay (outdoor clay)
Date: 3–6 February

The eight teams were divided into two pools of four teams. The teams that finished first in the pools played-off to determine which team would partake in the World Group II Play-offs. The four nations coming last or second-to-last in the pools also played-off to determine which would be relegated to Group II for 2011.

Pools

Play-offs

  advanced to 2010 World Group II Play-offs.

Group II
Venue: National Tennis Club, Guayaquil, Ecuador (outdoor clay)
Date: 19–24 April

The ten teams were divided into two pools of five teams. The teams that finished first and second in the pools played-off to determine which team would progress to the Group I.

Pools

Play-offs

  and  advanced to Group I for 2011.

See also
Fed Cup structure

References

 Fed Cup Profile, Puerto Rico
 Fed Cup Profile, Canada
 Fed Cup Profile, Colombia
 Fed Cup Profile, Cuba
 Fed Cup Profile, Bolivia
 Fed Cup Profile, Paraguay
 Fed Cup Profile, Mexico
 Fed Cup Profile, Peru
 Fed Cup Profile, Ecuador
 Fed Cup Profile, Bahamas
 Fed Cup Profile, Trinidad and Tobago
 Fed Cup Profile, Dominican Republic
 Fed Cup Profile, Bermuda
 Fed Cup Profile, Guatemala

External links
 Fed Cup website

 
Americas
Sport in Lambaré
Tennis tournaments in Paraguay
Sport in Guayaquil
21st century in Guayaquil
Tennis tournaments in Ecuador
2010 in Paraguayan sport
2010 in Ecuadorian sport